William Frye (died 1427), of Feniton, Devon, was an English politician.

Family
Frye married a woman named Joan.

Career
He was a Member (MP) of the Parliament of England for Exeter in January 1390, 1391 and September 1397.

References

14th-century births
1427 deaths
English MPs January 1390
English MPs 1391
English MPs September 1397
Members of the Parliament of England (pre-1707) for Exeter